The City of Port Phillip is a local government area of Victoria, Australia on the northern shores of Port Phillip, south of Melbourne's central business district. It has an area of 20.7 km² and had a population of 113,200 in June 2018.

Port Phillip contains a number of varied and substantial retail, entertainment and leisure precincts. These include Bay Street (Port Melbourne), Victoria Avenue (Albert Park), Clarendon Street (South Melbourne), Armstrong Street (Middle Park), Fitzroy Street (St Kilda), Acland Street (St Kilda), Carlisle Street (Balaclava) and Ormond Road (Elwood). A number of significant employment areas lie within Port Phillip, including part of the St Kilda Road business district and industrial, warehousing and manufacturing districts in South Melbourne and Port Melbourne. The city has experienced a significant amount of residential development in the 1990s, particularly in areas close to the foreshore. Port Phillip is well served by public transport with a substantial tram network, the St Kilda and Port Melbourne tram lines and two stations on the Sandringham railway line, in addition to bus services.

Comprising three multi member wards, it is predominantly an amalgamation of three former cities – St Kilda, parts of South Melbourne, most of Port Melbourne, as well as a small portion of Windsor from the former City of Prahran

The city was created with its present borders in June 1994 under the municipal restructure by the state government. It is bounded by White Reserve and Todd Road to the west, the West Gate Freeway, Kings Way and Dorcas Street to the north, St Kilda Road, High Street, Punt Road, Queens Way, Dandenong Road, Orrong Road, Inkerman Street, Hotham Street, Glen Huntly Road, St Kilda Street and Head Street generally to the east and the foreshore of Port Phillip to the south. Adjacent councils include the City of Melbourne, City of Bayside, City of Glen Eira and the City of Stonnington. When first created, the city was administered by three appointed commissioners, headed by Des Clarke. The first council elections were held in March 1996.

Council offices are currently located in the St Kilda Town Hall, Port Melbourne Town Hall and the South Melbourne Town Hall.  The council operates several other facilities including local libraries, child care centres, parks, playgrounds and community centres. In 2020 ANAM was given a long lease to South Melbourne Town Hall and council staff there and a few community groups vacated the building.

Schools
 Albert Park Primary School (Government)
 Elwood Primary School (Government)
 Galilee Regional Primary School (Catholic)
 Middle Park Primary School (Government)
 Port Melbourne Primary School (Government)
 St Kilda Park Primary School (Government)
 St Kilda Primary School (Government)
 Albert Park College (Government)
 Elwood Secondary College (Government)
 Mac.Robertson Girls' High School (High performance government secondary college for girls)
 St Michael's Grammar School (Church of England/Anglican)
 South Melbourne Primary School (Government)
 South Melbourne Park Primary School (Government)
 Port Melbourne Secondary College (Government)

Offices

 St Kilda Town Hall
 South Melbourne Town Hall
 Port Melbourne Town Hall

Libraries

 Albert Park
 Emerald Hill (South Melbourne)
 Middle Park
 Port Melbourne
 St Kilda

Notable institutions
 2/10 Medium Regiment, Royal Australian Artillery (Army Reserve, Chapel Street, St Kilda East)
 Australian National Music Academy (South Melbourne, in former City of South Melbourne Town Hall)
 City of Port Phillip Town Hall, St Kilda (Former City of St Kilda Town Hall, Council meeting usually on Tuesday with about 3 meetings per month. Port Phillip Meeting Agenda.)
 Greek Orthodox Archdiocese of Victoria (South Melbourne)
 Hare Krishna Temple (Albert Park)
 South Melbourne Football Club
 1st Victorian Sea Scout Group regarded as being the first Scout Group in Australia, founded in 1907, and is still currently active hosting Cubs, Scouts and a Venturer Unit based in the Albert Park Reserve

Notable events
 Gay Pride March (Fitzroy Street and Catani Gardens, St Kilda, dykes on bikes, boot scooting, marching groups, music and political activism)
 Australian Formula 1 Grand Prix (Albert Park Circuit), 4-day international motor racing event held in March or April. Includes a Supercars race.
 St Kilda Festival (300,000 people attend this annual music event, Fitzroy Street and Upper Esplanade closed, tram services to the event). This free event now cost ratepayers close to $1.5 million annually.
 St Kilda Film Festival (Australia's Top 100 short films, SoundKILDA: Australia Music Video Competition, international films, forums, Industry Open Day and much more)
 St Kilda Writers Festival (local and international writers compare their skills)
 Admiral Napier Cup, held in the last weekend of August and hosted by the 1st Victorian Sea Scout Group on Albert Park lake, is where Scouts and Venturers gather to participate in rowing, paddling and sailing competitions and recent addition of Iron Person events

Townships and localities
The 2021 census, the city had a population of 101,942 up from 100,863 in the 2016 census

^ - Territory divided with another LGA

Current Council Composition

Since 2016 Port Phillip City Council is composed of nine Councillors elected from three wards, up from seven in 2012. Councillors are elected for a fixed four-year term of office. The Mayor is elected by the Councillors at the first meeting of the Council. The most recent election was held in October 2020.

The current Council, elected in 2020, in order of election by ward, is as follows:

Election results

2020 election results

Elected Councillors of Port Phillip
 Dick Gross (1996-2008, 2016-2020)
 Patricia Brown OAM (1996-1999)
 Christine Haag (1996-1999)
 Frada Erlich (1996-1999)
 Ludwig Stamer (1996-1999)
 Liz Johnstone (1996-1999)
 Liana Thompson (1996-1999)
 David Brand (1996-1999, 2016-2020)
 Julian Hill (1999-2004)
 Carolyn Hutchens (1999-2004)
 John Lewisohn (1999-2002)
 Darren Ray (1999-2008)
 Peter Logan (2002-2008)
 Judith Klepner (2004-2012)
 Janet Cribbes (2004-2008)
 Janet Bolitho (2004-2012)
 Karen Sait (2004-2008)
 Serge Thomann (2008-2016)
 Frank O'Connor (2008-2012)
 John Middleton (2008-2012)
 Jane Touzeau (2008-2016)
 Rachel Powning (2008-2012)
 Amanda Stevens (2012-2016)
 Vanessa Huxley (2012-2016)
 Anita Horvath (2012-2016)
 Cr. Andrew Bond (2012-current)
 Bernadene Voss (2012-2020)
 Cr. Tim Baxter (2016-current)
 Cr. Katherine Copsey (2016-2022)
 Cr. Louise Crawford (2016-current)
 Ogy Simic (2016-2020)
 Cr. Marcus Pearl (2016-current)
 Cr. Heather Cunsolo (2020-current)
 Cr. Peter Martin (2020-current)
 Cr. Rhonda Clark (2020-current)
 Cr. Christina Sirakoff (2020-current)
 Cr. Robbie Nyaguy (2023-current)

Mayors
 List of Mayors of Port Phillip

Sister Cities and Friendship Links
  Ōbu, Aichi, Japan. (Since 1993)
  Suai, Cova Lima, East Timor. (Friendship link since 2000.)

See also
 List of localities (Victoria) for other Melbourne suburbs and municipalities.

References

External links
 City of Port Phillip – Official Website
 1st Victorian Sea Scout Group
 Link to Land Victoria interactive maps
 Public Transport Victoria local public transport map

Local government areas of Melbourne
Greater Melbourne (region)